Bystrite is a silicate mineral with the formula (Na,K)7Ca(Si6Al6)O24S4.5•(H2O), and a member of the cancrinite mineral group. It is a hexagonal crystal, with a 3m point group. The mineral may have been named after the Malaya Bystraya deposits in Russia, where it was found.

Bystrite is a cancrinite mineral and exhibits similar physical properties, composition and structure as other cancrinites.

Structure 

Bystrite has a structure that is shared with many of the minerals in the cancrinite group. It exhibits a hexagonal crystal structure with a 3m point group. Bystrite also has a P31c space group. The structure of bystrite could not be easily found due to the mineral exhibiting a strong pseudotranslation, therefore, mineralogists made a model to find out the internal structure of the bystrite mineral, the idea was based on analyzing the tetrahedral frameworks of cancrinite minerals, and it did yield accurate results in predicting the structure of the mineral. Bolotina et al. (2004)

Geologic occurrence 

The most studied sample of the mineral was found in the Malaya Bystraya deposit in Russia. Bystrite occurs in lazurite deposits, and is usually associated with lazurite, calcite, and diopside.

The mineral is not very widely spread, either that or it has not been really searched for due to the lack of importance or significance.

Literature survey 

The first paper addressing Bystrite was by Sapozhnikov, et al. and was originally written in Russian, but mineral data publishing translated most of the important information to English in 2001.

References

Cancrinite group
Trigonal minerals
Minerals in space group 159